Biston marginata is a moth of the family Geometridae. It is found in China (Zhejiang, Jiangxi, Hunan, Fujian, Guangdong, Guangxi, Chongqing, Yunnan), Taiwan, Japan and Vietnam.

References

Bistonini
Moths of Asia
Moths of Japan
Moths of Taiwan
Moths described in 1913